Josef 'Seppi' Angermüller (6 November 1949 – 24 April 1977) was an international speedway rider.

Speedway career
He was West German champion in 1973 and was the first German rider to secure a contract in the British League, riding for the Reading Racers 1971 and Hull Vikings in 1974. He was predominantly known as a Long track speedway rider. In the German Bundesliga he rode for Ruhpolding.

World Longtrack Championship
 1972 –  Mühldorf (8th) 11pts
 1973 –  Oslo (6th) 15pts
 1974 –  Scheeßel (5th) 13pts
 1976 –  Gornja Radgona (9th) 9pts

Death
Angermüller died 24 April 1977 after falling in a World Cup qualifying run at the Long Track in Civitanova Marche, Ancona, Italy.

References

1949 births
1977 deaths
German speedway riders
Motorcycle racers who died while racing
Hull Vikings riders
Reading Racers riders
Individual Speedway Long Track World Championship riders
Sport deaths in Italy
People from Pfaffenhofen (district)
Sportspeople from Upper Bavaria